Clathrodrillia lophoessa is a species of sea snail, a marine gastropod mollusk in the family Drilliidae.

Description
The length of the shell attains 9 mm.

Distribution
This species occurs in the Gulf of Mexico and in the Atlantic Ocean off Pernambuco, Brazil at depths of 640 m to 1234 m.

References

  Watson, R. B. 1882, Challenger Expedition, Report on the scientific results of the voyage of H.M.S. Challenge; Zoology v. 15 pt. 41-43, 1886 (described as Clionella lophoessa)
 Rosenberg, G., F. Moretzsohn, and E. F. García. 2009. Gastropoda (Mollusca) of the Gulf of Mexico, pp. 579–699 in Felder, D.L. and D.K. Camp (eds.), Gulf of Mexico–Origins, Waters, and Biota. Biodiversity. Texas A&M Press, College Station, Texas

External links
 

lophoessa
Gastropods described in 1882